Raymond Storey (born 1956 in Orillia, Ontario) is a Canadian playwright and television writer. He is best known for his plays The Saints and Apostles, which was a shortlisted finalist for the Governor General's Award for English-language drama at the 1993 Governor General's Awards, and The Glorious 12th, which won the Dora Mavor Moore Award for Outstanding New Play in 1996.

His other plays have included South of China, Adventures in Turning Forty, The Last Bus, Angel of Death, Country Chorale, The Dreamland, The Girls in the Gang and Cheek to Cheek. For television, his credits have included episodes of Road to Avonlea, Traders, Made in Canada, Wind at My Back, The Guard, King, Bomb Girls and Guidestones, and the television films Bach's Fight for Freedom, Butterbox Babies and Iron Road.

References

External links

20th-century Canadian dramatists and playwrights
21st-century Canadian dramatists and playwrights
Canadian male dramatists and playwrights
Canadian television writers
People from Orillia
Writers from Toronto
Living people
20th-century Canadian male writers
1956 births
21st-century Canadian male writers
Canadian male television writers